The Battle of Paterna (Paterna, 1065) took place between the troops of the Kingdom of León, under the command of Ferdinand I of León and Castile, and those of the Taifa of Valencia, commanded by Abd al-Malik ibn Abd al-Aziz al-Muẓaffar.  The battle occurred at the same time as the Siege of Valencia, resulted in a victory for the Kingdom of León.

Historical context 
In 1063, Fernando I of Leon sent his son, the infante Sancho to the aid of his vassal, Ahmad al-Muqtadir, king of the Taifa of Zaragoza when his city of Graus was being besieged by the forces of Ramiro I of Aragon.  Consequently, Ramiro, who was Fernando's brother, would be defeated and killed.

In the aftermath of that battle, there ensued a mass slaughter of Christians.  To appease public support, Ahmad al-Muqtadir stopped paying his vassal tribute to the Kingdom of León. King Fernando responded in 1065 by launching an expedition into the valley of the Ebro River, devastating the land and defeating al-Muqtadir, once again forcing him into a vassal state.

The expedition continued on towards the Taifa of Valencia, governed by Abd al-Malik ibn Abd al-Aziz al-Muẓaffar, with the intent on also turning that city into a vassal state.

The battle 
After besieging the city, Ferdinand I found the city's defenses to be extremely resilient and determined that it would be impossible to take them by an assault. The king therefore decided to call for a general retreat from the city.  The Muslim defenders of Valencia exited the city and began to harass the retreat of the Leonese forces. At Paterna, approximately five kilometers from Valencia on the left bank of the Turia, the Leonese troops set an ambush for the pursuing forces. Catching the Valencian attackers completely by surprise, they were wiped out almost to a man.  It was said that Abd al-Malik only escaped due to the speed of his horse.

The poet Abu Ishaq al-Tarasuní related the occurrences of the battle in the following verses translated from Spanish:

"The Christians were clad in bright armour, but ye were arrayed in silken robes of various colours.

Partana is the spot where your valour and their cowardice became once more manifest."

Aftermath 
After the battle, King Ferdinand I once again resumed the siege of Valencia.  Later during the siege, Ferdinand became ill  and once again ordered a retreat back to León where he died on December 27 of the same year, 1065.

See also 
 Ferdinand I of León and Castile
 Reconquista

References 
Al-Makkari, Nafh at-tib, II, 148–9.
Ibn Idhari, al-Bayan al-Mugrib, I, 111 y III, 252–3.

Citations 

1065 in Europe
Paterna
Paterna
Paterna
Paterna
11th century in the Kingdom of León
11th century in Al-Andalus
Paterna